Daniel Gabriel may refer to:

 Dan Gabriel, documentary filmmaker
 Daniel Llambrich Gabriel (born 1975), Spanish swimmer